Erdem Çetinkaya (born 29 March 2001) is a Turkish professional footballer who plays as a forward for the Turkish club Bodrumspor on loan from Kasımpaşa.

Professional career
Çetinkaya is a youth product of the academy of Kızılcahamam Belediyespor, and began his senior career with Ankaraspor in 2019. He joined Bodrumspor on loan for the 2021–22 season in the TFF Second League, where he scored 9 goals in 19 games. On 19 July 2022, he transferred to the Süper Lig club Kasımpaşa. He made his professional debut with Kasımpaşa on 8 August 2022 in a 4–0 Süper Lig loss to İstanbul Başakşehir, coming on as a late substitute. On 8 September 2022, Çetinkaya was loaned by Bodrumspor once again for a season (now promoted to the TFF First League), with an option to buy.

International career
Çetinkaya is a youth international for Turkey, having played for the Turkey U19s in 2019.

References

https://www.gundemtube.com/guncel-haberler/kasimpasa-ankaraspordan-oguzhan-efe-yilmazi-transfer-etti/

External links
 
 

2001 births
People from Ankara Province
Living people
Turkish footballers
Turkey youth international footballers
Association football forwards
Ankaraspor footballers
Kasımpaşa S.K. footballers
Süper Lig players
TFF First League players
TFF Second League players